This is a list of the mammal species recorded in Tibet. There are 30 mammal species in Tibet, all of which are adapted to the country's low temperatures and high elevations.

The following tags are used to highlight each species' conservation status as assessed by the International Union for Conservation of Nature:

Some species were assessed using an earlier set of criteria. Species assessed using this system have the following instead of near threatened and least concern categories:

Order: Rodentia (rodents) 

The order Rodentia is the largest group of mammals. They have two ever-growing incisors in the upper as well as in the lower jaw and must be kept worn down by gnawing.

Family: Cricetidae 
Subfamily: Arvicolinae (lemmings)
Genus: Eolagurus
Przewalski's steppe lemming, Eolagurus przewalskii LC
Subfamily: Cricetinae (hamsters)
Genus: Cricetulus
Tibetan dwarf hamster, Cricetulus alticola LC
Kam dwarf hamster, Cricetulus kamensis LC
Family: Sciuridae
Genus: Marmota (marmots)
Himalayan marmot, Marmota himalayana LC
Genus: Eupetaurus (woolly flying squirrels)
Tibetan woolly flying squirrel, Eupetaurus tibetensis DD

Order: Lagomorpha (rabbits, hares and pikas) 

Lagomorpha comprises rabbits, hares and pikas, which differ from rodents by having four incisors in the upper jaw and strictly herbivore diet.

Family: Leporidae (rabbits and hares)
Genus: Lepus
 Woolly hare, L. oiostolus 
Family: Ochotonidae (pikas)
Genus: Ochotona
 Gansu pika, O. cansus 
 Plateau pika, O. curzoniae 
 Tsing-ling pika, O. huangensis 
 Glover's pika, O. gloveri

Order: Artiodactyla (even-toed ungulates) 

The order Artiodactyla in Tibet are mainly herbivores, and some are economically important as transport animals.

Family: Bovidae
Subfamily: Antilopinae (antelopes)
Genus: Procapra
Tibetan gazelle, Procapra picticaudata NT
Przewalski's gazelle, Procapra przewalskii EN
Genus: Gazella
Goitered gazelle, Gazella subgutturosa VU
Genus: Pantholops
Tibetan antelope, Pantholops hodgsonii NT
Subfamily: Bovinae (cattle, buffaloes and allies)
Genus: Bos
Domestic yak, Bos grunniens NT
Family: Cervidae (deer)
Subfamily: Cervinae
Genus: Cervus
Thorold's deer, Cervus albirostris VU
Kansu red deer, Cervus canadensis kansuensis LC
Sichuan deer, Cervus canadensis macneilli LC
Family: Capridae (goats and sheep)
Subfamily: Caprinae
Genus: Pseudois
Bharal, Pseudois nayaur LC
Genus: Ovis
Argali, Ovis ammon NT

Order: Perissodactyla (odd-toed ungulates) 

The order Perissodactyla in Tibet is only comprised by a single species.

Family: Equidae (horses)
Subfamily: Equinae
Genus: Equus
Kiang, Equus kiang LC

Order: Carnivora (carnivorans) 

There are over 250 species of carnivorans, which are the top predators in the food webs.

Suborder: Feliformia
Family: Felidae (cats)
Subfamily: Felinae
Genus: Otocolobus
 Pallas's cat, Otocolobus manul NT
 Feral cat, Felis catus Domesticated
Genus: Lynx
 Eurasian lynx, Lynx linx LC 
Subfamily: Pantherinae
Genus: Panthera
 Snow Leopard, Panthera uncia EN
Suborder: Caniformia
Family: Canidae (dogs, wolves, jackals and foxes)
Subfamily: Caninae
Genus: Canis
Feral dog, Canis lupus familiaris Domesticated
Tibetan wolf, Canis lupus filchneri LC
Genus: Vulpes
Tibetan sand fox, Vulpes ferrilata LC
Red fox, Vulpes vulpes LC
Family: Mustelidae (weasels, otters, badgers and allies)
Subfamily: Mustelinae
Genus: Meles
Asian badger, Meles leucurus LC

See also

Wildlife of China
List of mammals of China
List of chordate orders
Mammal classification
Lists of mammals by region
List of prehistoric mammals
List of mammals described in the 2000s

Notes

References
 

Tibet
Mammals